Svatove Raion is a raion (district) in Luhansk Oblast of eastern Ukraine. the administrative center of the raion is the city of Svatove. Population: .

On 18 July 2020, as part of the administrative reform of Ukraine, the number of raions of Luhansk Oblast was reduced to eight, of which only four were controlled by the government, and the area of Svatove Raion was significantly expanded.  The January 2020 estimate of the raion population was

Demographics 
As of the 2001 Ukrainian census:

Ethnicity
 Ukrainians: 91.4%
 Russians: 7.3%
 Belarusians: 0.3%

References

Raions of Luhansk Oblast
 
1923 establishments in Ukraine